Stompers or The Stompers may refer to:

Sports teams
 Oakland Stompers, a North American Soccer League team in the 1978 season
 East Bay FC Stompers, a National Premier Soccer League team
 Sonoma Stompers, an independent professional baseball team based in Sonoma, California
 Stompers RFC, a Maltese rugby club
 St. Catharines Blue Jays, a Canadian minor league baseball renamed the St. Catharines Stompers (1996-1999)

Entertainment
 The Stompers (band), an American rock band
 Los Stompers, an Irish music group based in Barcelona, Spain
 Stompers (toy), a line of toy trucks and other vehicles

See also
 Stomp (disambiguation)
 "The Stomper", a ring name of Archie Gouldie, a retired Canadian professional wrestler